Eduardo Seruca (born 4 February 1967) is a Portuguese sailor. He competed in the men's 470 event at the 1992 Summer Olympics.

References

External links
 

1967 births
Living people
Portuguese male sailors (sport)
Olympic sailors of Portugal
Sailors at the 1992 Summer Olympics – 470
Place of birth missing (living people)